The Atari Lynx is a hybrid 8/16-bit fourth generation handheld game console released by Atari Corporation in September 1989 in North America and 1990 in Europe and Japan. It was the first handheld game console with a color liquid-crystal display. Powered by a 16 MHz 65C02 8-bit CPU and a custom 16-bit blitter, the Lynx was more advanced than Nintendo's monochrome Game Boy, released two months earlier. It also competed with Sega's Game Gear and NEC's TurboExpress, released the following year.

The system was developed at Epyx by two former designers of the Amiga personal computers. The project was called the Handy Game or simply Handy. In 1991, Atari replaced the Lynx with a smaller model internally referred to as the Lynx II. Atari published a total of 73 games before the Lynx was discontinued in 1995 in preparation for the launch of the Jaguar.

History
The Lynx system was originally developed by Epyx as the Handy Game. In 1986, two former Amiga designers, R. J. Mical and Dave Needle, had been asked by a former manager at Amiga, David Morse, to design a portable gaming system. Morse now worked at Epyx, a game software company with a recent string of hit games. Morse's son had asked him if he could make a portable gaming system, prompting a meeting with Mical and Needle to discuss the idea. Morse convinced Mical and Needle and they were hired by Epyx to be a part of the design team. Planning and design of the console began in 1986 and was completed in 1987. Epyx first showed the Handy system at the Winter Consumer Electronics Show (CES) in January 1989. Facing financial difficulties, Epyx sought partners. Nintendo, Sega, and other companies declined, but Atari and Epyx eventually agreed that Atari would handle production and marketing, and Epyx would handle software development. Epyx declared bankruptcy by the end of the year, so Atari essentially owned the entire project. Both Atari and others had to purchase Amigas from Atari arch-rival Commodore in order to develop Lynx software.

The Handy was designed to run games from the cartridge format, and the game data must be copied from ROM to RAM before it can be used. Thus, less RAM is then available and each game's initial loading is slow. There are trace remnants of a cassette tape interface physically capable of being programmed to read a tape. Lynx developers have noted that "there is still reference of the tape and some hardware addresses" and an updated vintage Epyx manual describes the bare existence of what could be utilized for tape support. A 2009 retrospective interview with Mical clarifies that there is no truth to some early reports claiming that games were loaded from tape, and elaborates, "We did think about hard disk a little."

The networking system was originally developed to run over infrared links and codenamed RedEye. This was changed to a cable-based networking system before the final release as the infrared beam was too easily interrupted when players walked through the beam, according to Peter Engelbrite. Engelbrite developed the first recordable eight-player co-op game, and the only eight-player game for the  Lynx, Todd's Adventures in Slime World.

Atari changed the internal speaker and removed the thumb stick on the control pad.

Its launch was successful. Atari reported that it had sold 90% of the 50,000 units shipped in the launch month in the U.S. with a limited launch in New York. US sales in 1990 were approximately 500,000 units according to the Associated Press. In late 1991, it was reported that Atari sales estimates were about 800,000, which Atari claimed was within its expected projections. Lifetime sales by 1995 amount to fewer than 7 million units when combined with the Game Gear. In comparison, 16 million Game Boy units were sold by 1995 because of its ruggedness, half price, much longer battery life, bundling with the smash hit Tetris, and superior game library.

As with the console units, the game cartridge design evolved over the first year of the console's release. The first generation of cartridges are flat, and designed to be stackable for ease of storage. However, this design proved to be very difficult to remove from the console and was replaced by a second design. This style, called "tabbed" or "ridged", adds two small tabs on the underside to aid in removal. The original flat style cartridges can be stacked on top of the newer cartridges, but the newer cartridges can not be easily stacked on each other, nor were they stored easily. Thus a third style, the "curved lip" style was produced, and all official and third-party cartridges during the console's lifespan were released (or re-released) using this style.

In May 1991, Sega launched its Game Gear portable gaming handheld with a color screen. In comparison to the Lynx it had shorter battery life (3–4 hours as opposed to 4-5 for the Lynx), but it is slightly smaller, has significantly more games, and cost $30 less than the Lynx at launch.

Retailers such as Game and Toys "R" Us continued to sell the Lynx well into the mid-1990s on the back of the Atari Jaguar launch, helped by magazines such as Ultimate Future Games which continued to cover the Lynx alongside the new generation of 32-bit and 64-bit consoles.

Lynx II

In July 1991, Atari introduced a new version of the Lynx, internally called the "Lynx II", with a new marketing campaign, new packaging, slightly improved hardware, better battery life, and a sleeker look. It has rubber hand grips and a clearer backlit color screen with a power save option (which turns off the backlighting). The monaural headphone jack of the original Lynx was replaced with one wired for stereo.

Decline

In 1993, Atari started shifting its focus away from the Lynx in order to prepare for the launch of the Jaguar; a few games were released during that time, including Battlezone 2000. Support for the Lynx was formally discontinued in 1995.

After the respective launches of the Sega Saturn and Sony PlayStation caused the commercial failure of the Jaguar, Atari ceased all game development and hardware manufacturing by early 1996 and would later merge with JTS, Inc. on July 30 of that year.

Features
The Atari Lynx has a backlit color LCD display, switchable right- and left-handed (upside down) configuration, and the ability to network with other units via Comlynx cable. The maximum stable connection allowed is eight players. Each Lynx needs a copy of the game, and one cable can connect two machines. The cables can be connected into a chain.

The Lynx was cited as the "first gaming console with hardware support for zooming and distortion of sprites". With a 4096 color palette and integrated math and graphics co-processors (including a sprite engine unit), its color graphics display was said to be the key defining feature in the system's competition against Nintendo's monochromatic Game Boy. The fast pseudo-3D graphics features were made possible on a minimal hardware system by co-designer Dave Needle having "invented the technique for planar expansion/shrinking capability" and using stretched, textured, triangles instead of full polygons.

Technical specifications

 Mikey (8-bit custom CMOS chip running at 16 MHz)
 WDC 8-bit 65SC02 processor (based on the MOS 6502) running at up to 4 MHz (3.6 MHz average)
 Sound engine
 4 channel sound
 8-bit DAC for each channel (4 channels × 8-bits/channel = 32 bits commonly quoted) these four sound channels can also switch in analogue sound mode to generate PSG sound.
 Video DMA driver for liquid-crystal display
 Custom built and designed by Jay Miner and David Morse
 160×102 pixels resolution
 4,096 color (12-bit) palette
 16 simultaneous colors (4 bits) from palette per scanline
 Variable frame rate (up to 75 frames/second)
 Eight system timers (two reserved for LCD timing, one for UART)
 Interrupt controller
 UART (for Comlynx) (fixed format 8E1, up to 62500 Bd / TurboMode 1,000,000Bd)
 512 bytes of bootstrap and game-card loading ROM
 Suzy (16-bit custom CMOS chip running at )
 Unlimited number of blitter "sprites" with collision detection
 Hardware sprite scaling, distortion, and tilting effects
 Hardware decoding of compressed sprite data
 Hardware clipping and multi-directional scrolling
 Math engine
 Hardware 16-bit × 16-bit → 32-bit multiply with optional accumulation; 32-bit ÷ 16-bit → 16-bit divide
 Parallel processing of CPU
 RAM: 64 KB 120ns DRAM
 Cartridges: 128, 256, 512 KB and (with bank-switching) 1 MB
 Ports:
 Headphone port ( stereo; wired for mono on the original Lynx)
 ComLynx (multiple unit communications, serial)
 LCD Screen: 3.5" diagonal
 Battery holder (six AA) 4–5 hours (Lynx I) 5–6 hours (Lynx II)

Reception
Lynx was reviewed in 1990 in Dragon, which gave it 5 out of 5 stars. The review states that the Lynx "throws the Game Boy into the prehistoric age", and praises the built-in object scaling capabilities, the multiplayer feature of the ComLynx cable, and the strong set of launch games.

Legacy
Telegames released several games in the late 1990s, including a port of Raiden and a platformer called Fat Bobby in 1997, and an action sports game called Hyperdrome in 1999.

On March 13, 1998, nearly three years after the Lynx's discontinuation, JTS Corporation sold all of the Atari assets to Hasbro Interactive for $5 million. On May 14, 1999, Hasbro, which held on to those properties until selling Hasbro Interactive to Infogrames in 2001, released into the public domain all rights to the Jaguar, opening up the platform for anyone to publish software on without Hasbro's interference. Internet theories say that the Lynx's rights may have been released to the public at the same time as the Jaguar, but this is clearly disputed. Nevertheless, since discontinuation, the Lynx, like the Jaguar, has continued to receive support from a grassroots community which would go on to produce many successful homebrew games such as T-Tris (the first Lynx game with a save-game feature), Alpine Games, and Zaku.

In 2008, Atari was honored at the 59th Annual Technology & Engineering Emmy Awards for pioneering the development of handheld games with the Lynx.

See also 
 List of Atari Lynx games
 History of Atari

References

External links

 AtariAge – Comprehensive Lynx Database and information
 Guide to Atari Lynx games at Retro Video Gamer
 Too Powerful for Its Own Good, Atari's Lynx Remains a Favorite 25 Years Later
 Atari Lynx review, 1990
 Atari Lynx Hardware Documentation
 Atari Lynx Development Wiki

Computer-related introductions in 1989
Handheld game consoles
Fourth-generation video game consoles
Lynx
1980s toys
1990s toys
65xx-based video game consoles
Public domain in the United States